"Move for Me" is a song by American DJ and record producer Kaskade and Canadian electronic music producer Deadmau5. It was released as the lead single from Kaskade's fifth studio album, Strobelite Seduction. The single, which features vocals by British singer Haley Gibby (who has separate 2005 collaboration with Kaskade and writer Finn Bjarnson called "Summer of Space"), reached number one on the Billboard Hot Dance Airplay chart in its September 6, 2008 issue, giving Kaskade his first number-one on this chart after having reached the top ten four times and deadmau5 his first number-one single on an American chart. Both artists would reach that same summit in October 2009 with "I Remember" with deadmau5 getting the lead billing and Kaskade being the featured collaborator. In late January 2009 it began charting in Canada. It debuted at number 98 on the Canadian Hot 100, and later peaked at 66.

"Move For Me" became available in the UK and Ireland on iTunes and other digital downloading sites as of 27 December 2009.

The song is also featured in DJ Hero 2.

Track listing

Charts

References

2008 singles
Kaskade songs
Deadmau5 songs
Electronic songs
House music songs
Songs written by Deadmau5
Songs written by Kaskade
Ultra Music singles
2008 songs
Songs written by Finn Bjarnson